Allobates goianus is a species of frog in the family Aromobatidae.
It is endemic to Goiás state, Brazil.
Its natural habitats are subtropical or tropical moist montane forest, rivers, freshwater marshes, and intermittent freshwater marshes.
It is threatened by habitat loss.

References

goianus
Endemic fauna of Brazil
Amphibians of Brazil
Taxonomy articles created by Polbot
Amphibians described in 1975